Steven Hilliard Stern (November 1, 1937 – June 27, 2018) was a Canadian television and documentary director, producer and writer.

Biography
Stern attended Ryerson Institute of Technology and served in the Canadian Infantry before inaugurating his directing career. He began his career in advertising, writing and directing radio and TV commercials, then moved to Los Angeles in the 1960s where he wrote for the ABC variety show, The Hollywood Palace.

The bulk of Stern's output was in the field of made-for-TV movies, both in the United States and Canada, focusing on women's issues, noir thriller, action/adventure and occasionally, sports. Some film credits may appear as Steve Stern and Steven H. Stern rather than the full middle name.

Stern died in Encino, California, on June 27, 2018, age 80.

Filmography
1971: B.S. I Love You
1972: Lo B'Yom V'Lo B'Layla 
1974: Harrad Summer
a.k.a. Love All Summer (USA: video title)
a.k.a. Student Union 
1975: I Wonder Who's Killing Her Now?
a.k.a. Kill My Wife Please
1977: Escape from Bogen County
1978: The Ghost of Flight 401
1978: Doctors' Private Lives
1978: Getting Married 
1979: Fast Friends
1979: Anatomy of a Seduction
1979: Young Love, First Love
1979: Running
a.k.a. Le vainqueur (Canada: French title)
1980: Portrait of an Escort 
a.k.a. Professional Date (USA) 
1981: Miracle on Ice
1981: The Devil and Max Devlin
1981: A Small Killing
1982: The Ambush Murders 
1982: Portrait of a Showgirl 
1982: Not Just Another Affair
a.k.a. Perfect Affair 
1982: Forbidden Love
1982: Mazes and Monsters
a.k.a. Dungeons and Dragons (USA: video box title) 
a.k.a. Rona Jaffe's Mazes and Monsters 
1983: Baby Sister
1983: Still the Beaver
1983: An Uncommon Love
1984: Draw!
1984: Getting Physical
1984: Obsessive Love
1985: The Undergrads (as Steven H. Stern) 
1985: Murder in Space
1985: Hostage Flight
1986: The Park Is Mine
1986: Young Again 
1986: Many Happy Returns1987: Not Quite Human (as Steven H. Stern) 
1987: Rolling Vengeance1988: Man Against the Mob a.k.a. Trouble in the City of Angels (USA: video title)
1988: Weekend War 
1988: Crossing the Mob
1989: Final Notice (as Steven H. Stern)
1990: Personals
1991: Money 
1991: Love & Murder
1992: The Women of Windsor
1993: Morning Glory
1994: To Save the Children (as Steven Stern) 
1995: Black Fox (as Steven H. Stern)
1995: Black Fox: The Price of Peace (as Steven H. Stern)
1995: The Silence of Adultery
a.k.a. as Laisse parler ton coeur (Canada: French title)
1995: Black Fox: Good Men and Bad (as Steven H. Stern)
1997: Breaking the Surface: The Greg Louganis Story
1998: City Dump: The Story of the 1951 CCNY Basketball Scandal (as Steve Stern, co-directed with George Roy)
2002: :03 from Gold (uncredited)

Television series
1976: Serpico (unknown number of episodes)
1976: Bonnie and McCloud (TV episode)
1976: McCloud (1 episode)
1976: Who's Who in Neverland
1976-1977: Quincy M.E. (2 episodes)
a.k.a. "Quincy" (International: English informal title)
1977: Dog and Cat (unknown number of episodes)
1977: Has Anybody Here Seen Quincy? (TV episode)
1977: Wipe-Out (TV episode)
1977: The Hardy Boys / Nancy Drew Mysteries (1 episode)
a.k.a. The Nancy Drew Mysteries (USA: short title) 
1977: Half LIfe (1 episode)
1977: Logan's Run (1 episode)
1977: Deep Cover (TV episode)
1977: Hawaii Five-O (1 episode)
a.k.a. McGarrett (USA: rerun title)
1981: Jessica Novak (1 episode)
1981: Closeup News (TV episode)
1998: Voices (TV episode)
1998: The Crow: Stairway to Heaven (1 episode)
1999: The Dream Team

Awards and nominations
In 1980, he was nominated for a Genie Award for "Best Original Screenplay" for Running

See also
 CCNY point shaving scandal

References

External links

Steven Hilliard Stern biography on FilmReference.com

1937 births
2018 deaths
Canadian television directors
Canadian male screenwriters
English-language film directors
Canadian television producers
Film directors from Ontario
Film producers from Ontario
Toronto Metropolitan University alumni
Writers from Timmins
20th-century American Jews
21st-century American Jews
20th-century Canadian screenwriters
20th-century Canadian male writers
21st-century Canadian screenwriters
21st-century Canadian male writers
Jewish Canadian writers